The A14 is a major trunk road in England, running  from Catthorpe Interchange, a major intersection at the southern end of the M6 and junction 19 of the M1 in Leicestershire to the Port of Felixstowe, Suffolk. The road forms part of the unsigned Euroroutes E24 and E30. It is the busiest shipping lane in East Anglia carrying anything from cars to large amounts of cargo between the UK and Mainland Europe.

Route
Beginning at the Catthorpe Interchange, the A14 runs through Kettering, Northamptonshire towards Huntingdon where it now runs parallel to the A1 past Brampton, Cambridgeshire and now bypasses Huntingdon completely due to the A14 Cambridge to Huntingdon Scheme from 2017 until 2022. It continues past Bar Hill towards Cambridge to meet the end of the M11 and the A428 at the Girton Interchange. The A14 continues easterly over northern Cambridge towards Newmarket where it briefly joins with the A11 to form the Newmarket Bypass between J36 and J38. The A11 splits off again towards the North and the A14 continues through Bury St Edmunds, past Stowmarket then on to bypass Ipswich via the Orwell Bridge and finally comes to an end at the Port of Felixstowe fully connecting the Midlands to East Anglia.

The road is a dual carriageway, mostly with two lanes each way, but there are some dual three-lane sections: on the Newmarket bypass (between Junctions 36 and 38) where it runs concurrent with the A11, at Kettering (between Junctions 7 and 9) and as of December 2019, with the opening of the Cambridge to Huntington improvement scheme, dual three-lanes between Milton and the A1 Junction at Brampton (Junctions 22 to 33). There is also a short dual four-lane section of the A14 that runs between Bar Hill and the Girton Interchange. There are three at-grade junctions: with the junction 59 at Trimley St Martin in Cambridgeshire (junction 15); at the Leighton Bromswold turn a few miles to the east (junction 17); and at the Dockspur Roundabout at the edge of Felixstowe (junction 60).

There were two additional at-grade roundabouts along the former A14 main route, these being Brampton Hut Interchange (Junction 21) and Spittals Interchange (former Junction 23). However, these junctions are no longer part of the A14 since the opening of the new alignment south of Huntingdon in December 2019.

The old A14 from Huntingdon Spittals interchange to Godmanchester was closed both ways for a 2-year period, and has now reopened in 2022 as part of the A1307, after the Huntingdon railway viaduct has been dismantled. Link roads at Hinchingbrooke and Mill Common will connect the former A14 dual carriageway to the road network in Huntingdon.

History
The current A14 includes parts of the former A45 between Felixstowe and Cambridge, the A604 between Cambridge and Kettering, a short stretch of the former A6 west of Kettering, plus a new link road which was constructed in the early 1990s between there and the M1/M6 interchange at Catthorpe, Leicestershire. Prior to the current A14, the main route from Birmingham to the Haven ports followed the M6, M1, A428 and A45 via Coventry, Rugby, Northampton, Bedford, St Neots and Cambridge, and then went through all the towns on the A14 to Felixstowe. Prior to its use for the current route, the A14 designation had been used for a section of road between the A10 at Royston and the A1 at Alconbury, following part of the route of Ermine Street which is now is designated the A1198 to Godmanchester and the A1307 to Alconbury. The section through Huntingdon is currently closed following the opening of the Huntingdon by-pass; Highways England plans to demolish a viaduct carrying the road over the River Great Ouse and the Great Northern railway and build junctions with local roads.

The M45 motorway was constructed in 1959 parallel to part of the old A45 in the Midlands. It opened on the same day as the M1 motorway and was soon one of the busiest sections of motorway. The M6 opened in the late 1960s and early 1970s, after which more traffic to the ports used the route from junction 1 of the M6 via the A427 to Market Harborough, followed by a short section of the A6 to Kettering and then the A604 to Cambridge, before joining the old A45 to the ports as above. The M45 now carries little traffic.

The sections from Huntingdon east to the ports were upgraded first, starting with the Huntingdon bypass in 1973, followed by the Girton-to-Bar Hill section in 1975/76 and the Cambridge northern bypass and Cambridge/Newmarket section in 1976/77. The Bar Hill-to-Huntingdon section opened in 1979, prior to the M11 which was fully opened in 1980. The Ipswich southern bypass, including the Orwell Bridge, opened between 1982 and 1985.

The A604 between Kettering and Huntingdon was upgraded and the section from Catthorpe to Kettering constructed between 1989 and 1991 (commonly referred to at the time as the "M1-A1 link road") following a lengthy period of consultation. The first inquiry was in 1974 and then a series of inquiries for sections of the preferred route from September 1984 until June 1985, during which objections came from some 1,130 sources. Subsequent public inquiries were held regarding Supplementary Orders. The route close to the site of the Battle of Naseby was particularly difficult, and was taken to the High Court. The link was opened by Transport Secretary John MacGregor on 15 July 1994.

Work to create a compact grade-separated junction (Junction 45/Rougham) and to re-align a  stretch of carriageway was completed in 2006.

Vehicles over 7.5 tonnes traveling east were banned from using the outside lane on a dual two-lane section on a  steep climb to Welford summit close to Junction 1 (A5199) from spring 2007; a similar scheme covered  of the westbound carriageway from Junction 2, including a particularly steep climb to Naseby summit. The bans are active between 6am and 8pm, and are intended to reduce delays to other traffic from lorries attempting to pass on these climbs.

Between 2007 and 2008 a new section of two-lane dual carriageway was constructed at the Haughley Bends, one of Suffolk's most notorious accident blackspots, to rationalise access using a new grade-separated junction. The road opened in the summer of 2008 with some associated local works being completed early in 2009.

Variable Message Signs (VMS), traffic queue detection loops and closed circuit TV (CCTV) were installed at a cost of £50M during 2009 to 2010 Both carriageways between Junction 52 (Claydon) and Junction 55 (Copdock) were refurbished during 2010 at a cost of £9 million. Work was being carried out a year earlier than scheduled as part of a UK government's fiscal stimulus package.

The Cambridgeshire Guided Busway connecting Cambridge, Huntingdon and St Ives, which opened in 2011, was intended to remove 5.6% of traffic using that section of the A14 (rising to 11.1% with the new Park & Ride sites), although as other traffic re-routes to the freed-up road space from other parts of the local road network, the net reduction is predicted to be 2.3%.

The Felixstowe and Nuneaton freight capacity scheme, designed to take more lorry traffic off the A14 between the Port and the Midlands by increasing rail capacity and allowing the carriage of larger 'Hi-cube' shipping containers by widening to the W10 loading gauge, opened in 2011.

Junction 55 (Copdock interchange) to the south of Ipswich was signalisation in 2011, along with lengthening the off-slip from the A1214. The section around Kettering between Junctions 7 and 9 was widened to three lanes between November 2013 and April 2015 at a cost of £42m.

After initially being shelved in 2010, the Catthorpe Interchange at the road's Western terminus underwent a massive restructuring in 2014. The redesigned junction was intended to allow free-flowing traffic movement between the A14, the southern terminus of the M6 motorway and Junction 19 of the M1 motorway. The first part opened in September 2016, and the upgrade was completed three months later.

A14 Cambridge to Huntingdon Improvement Scheme

The plan, originally called the 'A14 Ellington to Fen Ditton', was to include widening from Fen Ditton to Fen Drayton broadly on the existing alignment, and then a new route to be constructed from Fen Drayton to Ellington, the route following a widened A1 for a short distance south of Brampton Interchange. One of the main reasons for the widening and the new road was the volume of traffic using the existing road. This section was heavily used by local traffic, long-distance traffic to/from the M11 to A1(M), and freight traffic to/from Felixstowe and the Midlands. Another reason was the deteriorating condition of the Huntingdon viaduct over the East Coast Main Line. The viaduct was reaching the end of its life and needed replacing, a task that would require closing the road for a long period of time and not improve congestion.

The Highways Agency unveiled its plans in March 2005. Details of the preferred route for the Fen Drayton-to-Fen Ditton section were published in March 2007. The contract was awarded to Costain Skanska Joint Venture on 28 January 2008, which worked on detailed plans for the Highways Agency before publishing a draft order. The scheme was expected to open in stages between 2015 and 2016. The Highways Agency estimated that the widening and the new road would cost in total between £690 million and £1.2 billion, making this the most expensive scheme in its roads programme.

In October 2009 the cost estimate had risen to £1.3 billion with work due to start in 2012 and being completed in winter 2015/2016. The Campaign for Better Transport was opposed to the plans, listing their reasons for objection as the carbon emissions the road would induce, the cost, and its negative impact on non-car travel. The coalition government suspended the scheme when it came into power, with Philip Hammond, the Secretary of State for Transport, suggesting that the scheme would be 'axed', and that the only way it would get built was as a toll road. It was confirmed at the end of October that government money would not pay for the scheme, when Roads Minister Mike Penning said that the scheme was not affordable and no longer offered acceptable value for money. The scheme was officially cancelled in 2010.

In 2011, the government announced an 'A14 Challenge' inviting people to present proposals for the route. The revised scheme was similar to its predecessor and was now known as the 'A14 Cambridge to Huntingdon Improvement Scheme'. It involved widening of the A1 between Brampton and Alconbury, a new Huntingdon southern bypass, widening of the existing A14 from Swavesey to Milton, and a new local access road between Swavesey and Girton. The A14 through Huntingdon around the Huntingdon viaduct would be redundant and the viaduct demolished. In November 2012, it was reported that the scheme might be back on a fast track to implementation and it was mentioned in the June 2013 spending review. The project was approved by the Secretary of State for Transport in May 2016. Work was due to be completed by March 2021 at a cost of £1.2–1.8 billion.

In September 2018, Highways England said it was to ask the Planning Inspectorate to consider giving the upgraded section of A14 motorway status, to be known as the A14(M). However, shortly after the amendment of the Development Consent Order, the announcement came that the new Huntingdon southern bypass, between Brampton and the A1 to Swavesey, was ready a year ahead of schedule. Instead of waiting for the road to be reclassified, Highways England made the decision to withdraw the application so the road could be opened to traffic as soon as possible.

The  of new bypass opened a year ahead of schedule from the A14 at Swavesey to the A1 at Brampton on 9 December 2019, and the remainder of the route opened on 5 May 2020. A smart motorway in all but name, the new road has variable message signs and gantries, emergency SOS lay-bys and virtually all non-motorway traffic is prohibited from using the new road (this includes pedestrians, cyclists, horse riders, horses & carriages, motorcycles under 50cc and agricultural vehicles). The new route is also to be supplied with variable speed limits to reduce congestion when legislation is passed to allow this technology to be used on primary roads.

At the same time as the southern section opening, junctions on the A14 between Ellington and Bar Hill were renumbered. This upgraded section of the A14 has fewer junctions than previously; junctions 26 to 30 no longer exist. The section of the old A14 from Godmanchester to the Spittals interchange in Huntingdon was permanently closed after the Huntington bypass opened, in order to remove the Huntingdon viaduct over the East Coast Main Line. The project to build new links to the town centre is to be completed by 2022.

The construction works of the section between Huntingdon and Godmanchester, specifically where the River Great Ouse is crossed, was painted by Michael Murfin, a local artist. The artist's work records various stages of the build, depicting workers on the site and the heavy machinery used in the construction of the viaduct.

Junction list

Identity of the A14 spur from the A1(M) north of Huntingdon

From the A12 west of Ipswich to the M1/M6 junction, the A14 is part of (but not signed as) the E-road E 24, and from Ipswich to Felixstowe it is part of E 30.
The numbering of the A14 is inconsistent with the national road numbering scheme, as it begins in zone 5 and crosses through zone 6 on the way to zone 1 east of Huntingdon to Felixstowe. The road is concurrent with the A12 road from the Seven Hills Interchange to the Copdock Interchange which forms the Ipswich Southern bypass and with the A11 road between junctions 36 and 38.

Until the opening in 2019 of the Huntingdon bypass, there was some confusion as to the identity of the section of road between the A141 junction at Stukeley (Spittals Interchange) and the A1(M). The Ordnance Survey 1:25000 map showed the A-road section as part of the A14 and the motorway section (between the B1043 junction and the A1(M)) as the A14(M). However, some official documents, including the 1993 statutory instrument which authorised the motorway upgrade, referred to it as the A604(M). The same confusion appeared on the former Highways Agency page about the 1996-8 upgrade to the A1(M) between Alconbury and Peterborough. The signs on entering the motorway section, unusually, show a large "start of motorway" symbol with no number, and there are no driver location signs confirming the route number.

Following the opening of the Huntingdon bypass, the former A14 between the A1(M) and the Cambridge Services at Swavesey has been renumbered A1307, with the section through Huntingdon itself closed for the time being. Therefore, the "Alconbury spur" of the former A14 trunk route finally carries a unique road number again, in the form of the A1307. The official number of the former A14(M) stub is not known: some claim it is still A14(M), as the new road did not become a motorway in the end; others claim A604(M), although the lack of an A604 makes this hard to believe; and others still claim it is just a spur of the A1(M), carrying the same number.

East of the Girton Interchange with the M11 at Cambridge, the A14 used to be the A45, and much of the long-distance traffic further west had previously used the A45 route. The section between Cambridge and Kettering used to be the A604, apart from a short section near Kettering that used to be part of the A6. The road which was the A14 until the late 1980s is now the A1198 between Royston, Hertfordshire and Godmanchester.

Longer term plans
The Highways Agency has plans to increase capacity from junction 3 to junction 10 near Kettering 'in the longer term' and also to widen the road throughout Northamptonshire to "help cut the number of accidents and cope with the likely growth in traffic".

Notable incidents
 17 November 1998. A lorry collided with the petrol station between Bar Hill and Lolworth. The incident happened shortly before 11am and one person was killed and many others injured. The road was closed and there were huge tailbacks.
 26 July 2006. The A14 was closed for 24 hours near Newmarket when a van carrying acetylene gas canisters caught fire and the rescue services were advised by British Oxygen that they could remain unstable and would need 24 hours to cool. Bomb disposal officers were called in and the Red Cross set up a centre in Newmarket for those who were stranded.

References

External links 

GO East CHUMMS page containing links to the report documents
Public consultation on Huntingdon Bypass (March 2007)

Roads in England
Roads in Cambridgeshire
Transport in Northamptonshire
Roads in Suffolk
Proposed roads in the United Kingdom
Proposed transport infrastructure in the East of England
Constituent roads of European route E30